Wolfgang Auhagen (born in 1953) is a German musicologist.

Life 
Born in Hamburg, Auhagen studied musicology, art history and philosophy at the Georg-August-Universität Göttingen from 1973 until 1982. There he was awarded his doctorate with the thesis  and in 1992 with a thesis on the subject Experimentelle Untersuchungen zur auditiven Tonalitätsbestimmung in Melodien habilited. He teaches at the Martin-Luther-Universität Halle-Wittenberg.

From 2006 to 2010 he was Vice Dean of the Philosophical Faculty II of the Martin Luther University Halle-Wittenberg and from 2009 to 2017 the President of the Gesellschaft für Musikforschung.

Publications 
 Experimentelle Untersuchungen zur auditiven Tonalitätsbestimmung in Melodien. / 1, Text. , vol. 180, Bosse-Verlag Regensburg, 1994
 Wahrnehmung, Erkenntnis, Vermittlung : musikwissenschaftliche Brückenschläge : Festschrift für Wolfgang Auhagen.
 with Bram Gätjen and Christoph Reuter (ed.): Musikalische Akustik. (Kompendien Musik), Laaber-Verlag, Laaber 2015
 Systematische Musikwissenschaft : Ziele, Methoden, Geschichte.

References

External links 
 
 Eintrag im Forschungsportal Sachsen-Anhalt
 Profilseite der Universität Halle

20th-century German musicologists
Academic staff of the Martin Luther University of Halle-Wittenberg
1953 births
Living people
Writers from Hamburg